The Hugo Wolf Quartet is an Austrian string quartet ensemble.

History 
The quartet was founded in 1993 and took its name from the "Internationalen Hugo Wolf Gesellschaft Wien". Meanwhile, it plays in all important concert halls and festivals. Zbigniew Bargielski, Friedrich Cerha, Dirk D'Ase, Johannes Maria Staud and Erich Urbanner for example, composed works especially for this ensemble. Among the numerous recordings, one in particular received a favourable review, that of the complete String Quartets by Ludwig van Beethoven.

Awards 
 First prize at the 5th International String Quartet Competition in Cremona
 Best string quartet at the 45th International G. B. Viotti Competition for Chamber Music
 Fifth prize at the London International String Quartet Competition.
 European Chamber Music Prize

Members 
 Sebastian Gürtler, violin I
 Régis Bringolf, violin II
 Subin Lee, alto
 Florian Berner, cello

Former members 
 Jehi Bahk (violin I and II, 1992–1993, formerly called "Akademie Quartet")
 Jun Keller (violin I and II, 1992–1993, formerly called "Akademie Quartet")
 Jehi Bahk (violin I, 1993–2004)
 Petra Ackermann (alto, 1992–1993)
 Martin Edelmann (alto, 1993–1998)
 Wladimir Kossjanenko (alto, 1998–2007)
 Gertrud Weinmeister (alto, 2007–2013)
 Thomas Selditz (alto, 2013–2016)

References

External links 
 
 

Austrian string quartets
Musical groups established in 1993
1993 establishments in Austria